This list shows: Mobile Broadband Providers, Licensed Infrastructure Providers and Internet Service Providers

Mobile

Duopoly 

 MTN Group
 Vodacom

Quadopoly 

 Telkom Mobile
 Cell C

Pentaopoly 

 Rain

Other 
 Mr. Price Mobile 
 Virgin Mobile South Africa
 Me&You Mobile

Licensed Service Providers

Duopoly 

 Openserve
 Vumatel
 Vumatel Fiber Core
 Vumatel Fiber Reach

Medium 
 Frogfoot (South Africa)

Small (Others) 

 Clear Acess
 Evotel
 Fibre Geeks
 Lightstruck
 Link Africa
 Link Layer
 Metro Fibre
 Mitsol
 Octotel
 Teralink
 Vodacom
 Zoom Fibre
 SADV

Internet Service Providers 
Based on ISPA South Africa Membership

Large 

 Africa INX
 Business Connexion (Pty) Ltd
 CMC Global Consulting (Pty) Ltd
 Cool Ideas
 Cybersmart (Pty) Ltd
 Enetworks
 Enterprise Outsourcing Operations (Pty) Ltd
 Fixed Mobile Telecoms
 Internet Solutions
 MTN Business
 Rain (Pty) Ltd
 RSAWEB
 STEM
 Supersonic
 TENET
 Vox Telecom
 Webafrica
 Workonline Communications
 Xneelo (Pty) Ltd

Medium 

 Abutron PTY Ltd
 Altron Systems Integration
 BCS-Net
 BitCo Telecoms
 BRILLIANTEL (Pty) Ltd
 CipherWave Business Solutions (Pty) Ltd
 CloudAfrica
 Comtel Communications
 Easyweb Internet (Pty) Ltd
 EOH Network Solutions 
 Faircom
 FirstNet Technology Services (Pty) Ltd
 Huge Networks
 Info-Gro
 Maxwell Technology
 Mytelnet (Pty) Ltd
 Reflex Solutions
 Senreques
 SITA
 Switch Telecom
 Syrex (Pty) Ltd
 WIRU Pty Ltd
 ZACR

Small 

 28East (Pty) Ltd
 Access Point Technologies (PTY) Ltd
 Active Fibre
 Adept ICT
 AdNotes
 Aerocom Broadband
 Afrihost
 Agile Solutions Provider
 Airpark Beaufort West
 Albany Schools Network
 Alesco Internet Solutions
 AllWorldIT
 Amobia Communications
 ARM.it
 ASAP Internet
 Atomic Access
 Axxess DSL
 Backspace Technologies (pty) ltd
 Bandwidth Barn
 BestInternet
 betaNetworks
 BreedeNet
 Business Services
 Buzzdotnet
 C-Way Computers
 Cape Connect Internet (Pty) Ltd
 Cape Town Digital 
 Carrier Select
 Centx Group Pty Ltd
 Clear Access (Pty) Ltd
 Cloudseed (Pty) Ltd
 CM Value Added Services
 Computer and Satellite Electronics (CSE Pty Ltd)
 ComX Networks
 Conekt Business Group
 Converged Telecoms
 CUBE ICT Solutions (Pty) Ltd
 Cyber Nugget
 Dark Fibre Africa (Pty) Ltd
 Dashfibre
 DigiServ Technologies CC
 Digital Zoo
 directel
 Domain Name Service (Pty) Ltd
 Domains.co.za
 Dube Tradeport
 e-Schools' Network
 ECN
 Edge Connect (Pty) Ltd
 Elitehost 
 Enyuka Internet Access
 Equation Business Solutions
 FFG Connection
 Fibre To The Apartment (Pty) Ltd
 Fibreless
 FREDD
 Geek Managed Services
 GrandWell Technology
 Green Flash Trading 
 Heficed
 Hostking
 IBITS Internet
 Iclix (Pty) Ltd
 iConnect Telecoms
 Imagine IPS
 Imaginet
 InfoStream Technologies
 Infraplex
 Intdev Internet Technologies
 Inter Solutions
 Interexcel
 Internext
 ION Consulting
 iONLINE
 IOT Industry Council
 IPComms
 ISP Solutions
 iSpace
 IvyWeb
 JAWUG
 Ladysmith Wireless Solutions
 LanDynamix
 Lanline
 Leftclick
 Linux Tech
 LQ Technologies
 Marion
 Maxitec Internet Services
 Mimecast South Africa
 Mobility Online
 Music In Africa Foundation
 MWEB
 MyBroadband Online
 MyIweb
 NetConnect
 Network & Computing Consultants
 Network Platforms
 NOM.ZA
 Ntelecom
 NWET
 Opentel Technologies
 PacketSky
 PC Maniacs
 Platformity
 Rapid Networks
 Redwill ICT
 Rhodes University
 River BroadBand
 Saicom Voice Services
 Securicom
 Shanti Africa Technology
 Smart Technology Centre
 Sonke Telecommunications
 STM Communication
 Sybaweb
 synch.cc
 Tech 5
 Techseeds Group
 University of Cape Town
 University of the Witwatersrand
 UNIWISP
 Vanilla
 Velocity Trade Financial Services
 Veritech Communication
 Verizon
 Voice and Data
 Web Squad Connect
 Web4Africa
 Xtranet Internet Services
 ZSD

Provisional Members 
These members are in the process of joining the ISP association

 Airfibre Solutions
 Calmex
 Emalangeni Technologies
 Marta Group
 Vo Connect
 Vodacom (Pty) Ltd
 Wibernet
 Wiiconnect
 ZANOG

Satellite
 Twoobii
 Vox (South Africa)
 Vodacom

References